Saint-Jean-de-Cherbourg is a parish municipality in the Canadian province of Quebec, located in La Matanie Regional County Municipality.

Demographics 

Population trend:
 Population in 2021: 163 (2016 to 2021 population change: -1.2%)
 Population in 2016: 165 
 Population in 2011: 193 
 Population in 2006: 218
 Population in 2001: 201
 Population in 1996: 239
 Population in 1991: 230

Private dwellings occupied by usual residents: 73 (total dwellings: 93)

See also
 List of parish municipalities in Quebec

References

Parish municipalities in Quebec
Incorporated places in Bas-Saint-Laurent